Lamprocyphus is a genus of true weevil family.

List of selected species 
 Lamprocyphus augustus (Illiger)
 Lamprocyphus consularis (Chevrolat)
 Lamprocyphus elegans (Roelofs)
 Lamprocyphus germari (Boheman, 1833)
 Lamprocyphus gloriandus (Schoenherr) 
 Lamprocyphus margaritaceus (Sturm)
 Lamprocyphus oliveirae (Roelofs)
 Lamprocyphus spixi (Perty, 1833) 
 Lamprocyphus varnhageni (Germar)

References 

 Universal Biological Indexer
 Encyclopedia of Life
 Data.gbif
 Zipcodezoo

 
Taxa named by Guy Anstruther Knox Marshall